Dighawani is a census town in Chhindwara district  in the state of Madhya Pradesh, India.

Demographics
 India census, Dighawani had a population of 7935. Males constitute 53% of the population and females 47%. Dighawani has an average literacy rate of 61%, higher than the national average of 59.5%: male literacy is 70% and, female literacy is 51%. In Dighawani, 13% of the population is under 6 years of age.

References

Cities and towns in Chhindwara district